Gunshot is a British hip hop group, formed by MC Mercury, MC Alkaline, Q-Roc, DJ White Child Rix and DJ/MC Barry Blue in the area of Leyton in east London, around 1988/1989. They were originally called Sudden Impact.

Career
They released their debut single "Battle Creek Brawl" (Vinyl Solution, 1990) to some acclaim, which was followed swiftly by the single "No Sell Out/Crime Story" (Vinyl Solution, 1991). Both singles were well received within the hip hop scene, but following this release Q-Roc left the group to join Son of Noise under the name Curoc. Mercury, Alkaline and White Child Rix continued with the group, releasing a succession of singles in 1991/1992, that soon cemented them a place as one of the leaders of the UK hip hop scene. Their style was hardcore and fast, quickly coming to be considered—along with groups such as Hijack—the defining style of the genre.

One of their releases in this period was "Killing Season/Nobody Move" (Vinyl Solution, 1992), which was the first of their tunes to feature guest vocals from the rapper Barry Blue. Blue continued to provide guest vocals on some tracks for the group right up until their final album, as well as releasing the White Child Rix produced "The Story Begins . . . EP" (Move, 1994) as a solo artist.

The reception of Gunshot's first singles by British hip hop fans and DJ's was good and demand grew for an album. The group released Patriot Games, notable for the track "Mind of a Razor," which was subsequently released as a single and included a remix by the British extreme metal band, Napalm Death. Patriot Games reached number 60 in the UK Albums Chart in June 1993.

More singles followed, including "Color Code" (Vinyl Solution, 1994) which featured remixes by Depth Charge - repaying the favour of Alkaline rapping for them on the "Depth Charge vs Silver Fox" (Silver Fox Records, 1991) single.

A second album was never released, instead Vinyl Solution released a compilation of the group's singles.  This marked the end of Gunshot's association with Vinyl Solution, and the group went underground. They communicated with their fans via their now defunct website, whilst they worked on getting a new recording contract.

Another single and album – Twilights Last Gleaming (Words of Warning, 1997), was followed by their next CD, International Rescue, in 2000. The track "The English Patient" included guest spots from The Icepick, Blade, MC Mell'O' and Chester P. The album was billed as Gunshot's final before it was released. In 2017, Naked Ape Records and Underground United reissued the album on double vinyl.

From 2001 to 2003 Alkaline has guested on tracks by Junior Disprol and Aspects, while Mercury featured on a track from Snuff The Ablist.

After an 18 year hiatus, in 2018 saw the return of Gunshot with their new single "Sulphur", followed up by their newest release, "Burn Cycle", in February 2020.

Discography

Singles
 "Battle Creek Brawl" (Vinyl Solution, 1990)
 "Crime Story" / "No Sell Out" (Vinyl Solution, 1991)
 "Clear From Present Danger" / "Interception Squad" (Vinyl Solution, 1991)
 "Killing Season" / "Nobody Move!" (Vinyl Solution, 1992)
 "Children of a Dying Breed" (Vinyl Solution, 1993)
 "Mind of a Razor" (Vinyl Solution, 1994)
 "Colour Code" / "Gunshots History" (Vinyl Solution, 1994)
 "Colour Code Remixes" (Vinyl Solution, 1994)
 "Ghetto Heartbeat" (Words of Warning, 1997)
 "Sulphur" - (Naked Ape Records / Underground United, 2018)
 "Sulphur Remix" - (Naked Ape Records / Underground United, 2018)
 "Burn Cycle" - (Underground United, 2020)

Albums
 Compilation (Vinyl Solution, 1992)
 Patriot Games (Vinyl Solution, 1993)
 The Singles (Vinyl Solution, 1994)
 Phantasmagoria (Unreleased 1994)
 Twilights Last Gleaming (Words of Warning, 1997)
 International Rescue (CD on Words of Warning, 2000)
 International Rescue (2xLP on Naked Ape Records / Underground United 2017)

Compilations
 Construct Destruct on Underground United Vol. 1 (Naked Ape Records / Underground United, 2009)

 Bullet Entering Chest (Original Version) on Underground United Vol. 2 (Naked Ape Records / Underground United, 2011)

 Average New Yorker on Underground United Vol. 3 (Naked Ape Records / Underground United, 2016)

Remixes
 Senser – "Age of Panic (The Sick Man Remix)" (Ultimate Records 1994)
 Pitchshifter – "Triad (Gunshot Remix)" on the remix album The Remix War along with Therapy? & Biohazard (Earache 1994)
 Die Krupps – "Crossfire (Gunshot Remix)" on the album Fatherland (Cleopatra 1995)
 Hoodwink – "Dun' Like A Kipper (Gunshot Mix)" (Mute Records 1997)
 Chumbawamba – "Tubthumping (Gunshot Mix)" (EMI 1997)

Guest appearances
 Depth Charge – "Depth Charge vs Silver Fox" (Vinyl Solution, 1991) 
 B.R.O.T.H.E.R. Congress – "Ghettogedden" (1992)
 Killa Instinct – "No More Need For Whisphering" ft Gunshot and II Tone Committee (Move, 1996) The Penultimate Sacrfice EP)
 DJ White Child Rix – scratching on Chumbawamba's album WYSIWYG (EMI, 2000)
 Aspects – "Chase The Devil" ft MC Alkaline (Sanctuary Records 2004) Mystery Theatre? LP
 DJ Snuff - "Hip Hop Blues" ft MC Mercury (Dented, 2008)

Music videos
 "Battle Creek Brawl" (1990)
 "Crime Story" (1991)
 "Mind of a Razor" (1994)
 "Sulphur" (2018)

References

External links
 Interview with MC Mercury
 Britishhiphop.co.uk – The original UK Hip Hop History
 Live performance and interview on Freestyle, German TV (1994?)
 The Pioneers: The British Hip Hop Documentary (2000)
 Gunshot biography

English hip hop groups